Dark Star Orchestra is a Grateful Dead cover band formed in Chicago, Illinois. They serve as a tribute band to the rock group the Grateful Dead. Since 1997, the band has been "celebrating the Grateful Dead concert experience."

Overview
Dark Star Orchestra performs shows from among the nearly 2,500 concerts of the Grateful Dead during their 30-year tenure performing improvisational rock. On most, though not all of their performances, Dark Star Orchestra presents the complete original set list, song by song, and in order, while adapting their phrasing, voice arrangements and specific musical equipment for the various eras of the Grateful Dead shows in which they perform.

Members of the Grateful Dead themselves, including rhythm guitarist/singer Bob Weir, bassist Phil Lesh, drummer Bill Kreutzmann, vocalist Donna Jean Godchaux and keyboardists Vince Welnick and Tom Constanten, have all appeared on stage and performed with Dark Star Orchestra. In November 2011, the group played its 2,000th show in Ithaca, New York.

History
Dark Star Orchestra has been playing live shows together since 1997, after guitarist John Kadlecik contacted keyboardist Scott Larned with a concept (introduced by a common friend Andrew "Tiny" Dofner): performing complete Grateful Dead shows out of history. When Scott mentioned having the same idea, John knew they were on to something. Since forming, the band has performed over 2,500 shows.

On lead guitar and vocals, John Kadlecik used amp rigs and equipment to imitate guitar tone of Jerry Garcia from the show being recreated. When a 70s show is being performed, vocalist Lisa Mackey provides Donna Godchaux's female harmonies.

Dino English delivers the rhythmic drumming sounds of Bill Kreutzmann. On the other drum set, Rob Koritz, fills the Mickey Hart role. Kevin Rosen provides a style of bass playing similar to that of Phil Lesh. Rob Eaton performs rhythm guitar and vocals in the style of Bob Weir.

In November 1998, on the eve of their first anniversary, Mike Gordon and Jon Fishman of Phish joined DSO at Martyrs' after their own show. Fishman sat in for the majority of the evening, which included a drum section with four percussionists. The ensuing buzz caused national interest in the band. That winter, their Colorado tour sold out almost every stop and soon after, The Washington Post declared them "the hottest Grateful Dead tribute act going"; USA Today claimed DSO was "channeling the Dead" but what they do is not just a tribute to the Grateful Dead but a testament to the enormous number of unique set lists the band performed in their long career.

Continuing their growth, DSO has performed up to 200 dates in a year. Their popularity has grown continually, playing at larger venues and theaters, collaborating with guests including Grateful Dead alumni Bob Weir, Phil Lesh, Bill Kreutzmann, Donna Jean Godchaux-Mackay, Vince Welnick and Tom Constanten.

On 29 October 2004, Dark Star Orchestra played their 1,000th show at Carolina Theatre in Greensboro, N.C. The show did not adhere to a particular Grateful Dead setlist but was instead composed of highlights from throughout the Dead's history. The show was recorded by the DSO crew and distributed as a 3-CD set. 

In 2008, Dark Star Orchestra performed over 150 shows throughout the U.S. In addition to the complete Grateful Dead show selections, the band has been known to incorporate Jerry Garcia Band show setlists as well as original set lists of their own choosing.

During the band's Spring tour in 2005, co-founder Scott Larned died of a heart attack on April 24. The band reeled for a while, featuring the talents of guest keyboardists, including Dan Klepinger and Tom Ryan, until selecting Rob Barraco as a permanent replacement in 2007.

In 2009 John Kadlecik joined a new band with original Grateful Dead members Phil Lesh and Bob Weir called Furthur. On November 16, 2009 he officially announced that he was leaving Dark Star Orchestra. His final show with the band was on December 5, 2009. For DSO's 2009–10 winter shows, he was replaced by guitarist Jeff Mattson of the Zen Tricksters and the Donna Jean Godchaux Band. Mattson now is considered the permanent guitarist for DSO.

On May 3, 2013 it was announced that bassist Kevin Rosen would be leaving the band. He was quoted as saying "After all my years of touring with Dark Star Orchestra, I find myself in need of an extended break from life on the road. In addition, my mother’s declining health makes it even more important to be home at this time."

The band had its 25th anniversary tour in fall 2022.

Members

Current members
Lisa Mackey – vocals (1997–present)
Rob Koritz – drums, percussion (1999–present)
Dino English – drums, percussion (1999–present)
Rob Eaton – rhythm guitar, vocals (2001–present)
Rob Barraco – keyboards, vocals (some shows in 2005 and 2006, 2007–present)
Jeff Mattson – lead guitar, vocals (one show in 2005, 2009–2010, 2010–present)
Skip Vangelas – bass, vocals (some shows in 2001, 2013–present)

Former members
Kevin Rosen – bass, vocals (1997-1998, 2000-2013)
John Kadlecik – lead guitar, vocals (1997–2009)
Scott Larned – keyboards, vocals (1997–2005, deceased)
Mike Maraat – rhythm guitar, vocals (1997–1999)
David Strome – cowbell (1999)
Steve Gambuzza – theremin (2000)
Ahmer Nizam – drums (1997–1999)
Michael Hazdra – bass, vocals (1998–2000, some shows in 2001)
Mark Corsolini – drums (1998–1999)

Touring substitutes/guests
Dave "Chopper" Campbell – rhythm guitar, vocals (some shows in 2000)
John Sabal – rhythm guitar, vocals (some shows in 2000)
Bustar – rhythm guitar, vocals (some shows in 2000)
Jim Harris – rhythm guitar, vocals (some shows in 2000 and 2001)
David Berg – rhythm guitar, vocals (some shows in 2000 and 2001)
Gregg Koerner – bass, vocals (some shows in 2001)
Tom Ryan – keyboards, vocals (some shows in 2005)
Dan Klepinger – keyboards, vocals (some shows in 2005, 2006 and 2007)
Stu Allen – lead guitar, vocals (some shows in 2010)
Jim Allard – bass, vocals (2013 summer tours)
Jeff Chimenti – keyboards, vocals (some shows in 2016)

Band member timeline

Tours

2008
1500 And Counting Tour
European Tour
Spring Tour
Road To The Roo Tour
All Good Vibes Tour
Like A Tumbleweed Tour
Red Caravan Tour
Cosmic New Year's Run

2009
Winter Tour
Spring Tour West
Spring Tour East
Summer Tour
Rex Caravan Tour
Fall Tour
Cosmic New Year's Run

2010
Southbound Winter Tour
One Way Or Another Tour
Seeds Of Light Tour
Rock My Soul Summer Tour
A Slingshot On Mars Tour
Wings A Mile Long Tour
From A City Near You Tour
Cosmic New Year's Run

2011
Southbound Winter Tour
Four Winds Tour
Into The Sun Tour
Hearts Of Summer Tour
Last Rose Of Summer Tour
Fall Tour
Cosmic New Year's Run

2012
Southbound Winter Tour
European Tour
Spring Tour West
Spring Tour East
Meet Me At The Jubilee Summer Tour
Fall Tour West
Fall Tour East
Cosmic New Year's Run

2013
Winter Tour
Spring Tour West
Spring Tour East
Summer Tour Midwest
Summer Tour Northeast
Fall Tour West
Fall Tour East
Cosmic New Year's Run

2014
Winter tour
Spring tour east
Fall tour east

2015
Special Acoustic Show at Terrapin Crossroads
Spring Tour West
Rob Eaton to perform with The Rocky Mountain Grateful Dead Revue
Rob Eaton to perform with Axile Tilt
Special Acoustic Show in Washington, D.C.
Spring Tour East
Dark Star Jubilee
Mattson, Barraco & Friends
3 Special JGB Shows
Summer Tour

References

Further reading
  
  
  
  
  
  
  
  
  
  
  
 
 Interview with Rob Eaton on Centerstage Chicago (January 2007)

External links
 www.darkstarorchestra.net, official website of Dark Star Orchestra
 www.dinoenglishproductions.com, official website of Dino English
 Live Dark Star Orchestra at the Internet Archive
www.johnkmusic.net – John Kadlecik's official website & personal pages
Interview with John Kadlecik from honesttune.com
Jeff Mattson sits down with Ira Haberman of The Sound Podcast for a feature interview
John Kadlecik feature interview on The Sound Podcast with Ira Haberman

Tribute bands
Grateful Dead
Rock music groups from Illinois
1997 establishments in Illinois
Jam bands
American psychedelic rock music groups
Cover bands